Events from the year 1953 in France.

Incumbents
President: Vincent Auriol 
President of the Council of Ministers: 
 until 8 January: Antoine Pinay
 8 January – 28 June: René Mayer
 starting 28 June: Joseph Laniel

Events
4 January – Operation Bretagne ends, with French victory over the Viet Minh in Vietnam.
9 May – France agrees to the provisional independence of Cambodia with the king Norodom Sihanouk.
5 July – First meeting of the assembly of the European Economic Community in Strasbourg.
17 July – Miss France Christiane Martel Won Miss Universe 1953
28 July – Operation Camargue, further French military action against the Viet Minh, begins.
10 August – Operation Camargue ends.
13 August – 4 million workers go on strike in France to protest against austerity measures.
25 August – General strike ends in France.
9 November – Cambodia becomes independent from France.
20 November – Operation Castor, airborne operation to establish a fortified airhead in Điện Biên Province, starts.
22 November – Operation Castor ends.

Arts and literature
4 January – En Attendant Godot premiered at

Sport
3 July – Tour de France begins.
27 July – Tour de France ends, won by Louison Bobet.

Births
28 January – Anicée Alvina, singer and actress (died 2006)
20 February – Gérard Araud, diplomat
16 March – Isabelle Huppert, actress
8 August – Jean Hélène, journalist (died 2003)
19 August – Benoît Régent, actor (died 1994)
22 September – Ségolène Royal, politician
12 October – Serge Lepeltier, politician
14 November – Dominique de Villepin, politician, Prime Minister of France
23 November – Francis Cabrel, singer-songwriter
29 November – Christine Pascal, actress, writer and director (died 1996)
1 December – Antoine de Caunes, television presenter, actor, writer and film director

Deaths
24 March – Paul Couturier, priest and promoter of the concept of Christian unity (born 1881)
4 April – Rachilde, author (born 1860)
4 July – Jean Becquerel, physicist (born 1878)
9 August – Auguste Giroux, rugby union player (born 1874)
30 November – Francis Picabia, painter and poet (born 1879)

See also
 List of French films of 1953

References

1950s in France